Fyfield may refer to:

People with the surname 
Frances Fyfield (born 1948), pseudonym of Frances Hegarty, English lawyer and crime-writer
Jamal Fyfield (born 1989), English footballer
Simon Fyfield, 16th-century English Member of Parliament

Places in England 
Fyfield, Essex
Fyfield, Gloucestershire, a hamlet in Eastleach parish
Fyfield, Hampshire
Fyfield, Oxfordshire
Fyfield, Wiltshire, a village 3 miles west of Marlborough
Fyfield (Pewsey), a hamlet 1 mile east of Pewsey, Wiltshire
Fyfield Down, on the Marlborough Downs in Wiltshire

Other uses 
 Fyfield Road, Oxford, England

See also
Fifield (disambiguation)